General Ziegler refers to William Smith Ziegler (1911–1999), a Canadian Army brigadier general. General Ziegler may also refer to:

Heinz Ziegler (1894–1972), German Wehrmacht general
Joachim Ziegler (1904–1945), German Waffen-SS major general